The Boeing B-17 Flying Fortress is an American four-engine heavy bomber used by the United States Army Air Forces and other Allied air forces during World War II. Forty-five planes survive in complete form, including 38 in the United States. Fewer than 10 are airworthy.

Of the 12,731 B-17s built, about 4,735 were lost during the war. After the war, planes that had flown in combat missions were sent for smelting at boneyards, such as those at Walnut Ridge and Kingman. Consequently, only six planes that survive today have seen combat. Most of the other survivors were built too late to see active service and then were used through the 1950s and 1960s in military and civilian capacities. Many are painted to represent actual planes that flew in combat.

Surviving aircraft 
, 18 B-17s are registered with the Federal Aviation Administration (FAA). These include Nine-O-Nine (N93012, crashed in October 2019), Texas Raiders (N7227C, crashed in November 2022), and a B-17G registered in Granite Falls, Minnesota (N4960V) that was scrapped in 1962. The other 15 are in the following table.

Of the B-17s registered with a civil aviation authority, such as the FAA, less than 10 are being kept in airworthy condition, and some of those have not been flown for more than five years. Some other B-17s are being restored, and may become airworthy in the future.

Aircraft by manufacturer 

Bold denotes a plane that is airworthy, excluding planes that have not been flown for more than five years. There are six.

Italics denotes a plane that is potentially airworthy, but has not been flown in the past five years. There are three.

 denotes a plane that was used in combat. There are six.

The surviving aircraft include examples of four B-17 variants: one B-17D, four B-17Es, and three B-17Fs, with the rest delivered as B-17G. Some B-17G survivors have been modified to represent B-17Fs, such as for filming of the 1990 movie Memphis Belle. B-17G 44-8543 has been modified, including having its chin turret removed, to more closely resemble the B-17F that it wears the livery of ("Ye Olde Pub").

List 
The aircraft are listed in ascending order by their serial numbers, which do not necessarily reflect the order in which they were delivered. Serial numbers are linked to the specific aircraft's article, when available. The location column sorts by country, then by state for aircraft in the United States.

Related aircraft

Known wrecks 
In addition to the 45 surviving planes, there are several known complete or near-complete wrecks around the world. The most recent wreck to be recovered (Swamp Ghost) was removed from a swamp in Papua New Guinea in 2006. There are currently no plans underway to recover any wrecks.

Re-build projects 
These are projects utilizing salvaged B-17 parts or partial B-17s.
 42-3455 Lucky Thirteen – A project to build an airworthy B-17F, incorporating some parts recovered in France from a September 1943 crash.
 44-83387 Piccadilly Lily – A surviving B-17G fuselage, used as a prop for the Twelve O'Clock High movie and 12 O'Clock High television series, being rebuilt with elements from other B-17s.

See also 
 Accidents and incidents involving the Boeing B-17 Flying Fortress

Notes

References 

Boeing B-17 Flying Fortresses
World War II bombers of the United States
Survivors